This is a list of notable people who were born or have lived in Yekaterinburg (1924–1991: Sverdlovsk), Russia.

Born in Yekaterinburg

18th and 19th century

1701–1900 
 Ivan Polzunov (1728–1766), Russian inventor. He created the first steam engine in Russia and the first two-cylinder engine in the world.
 Juvenaly of Alaska (1761–1796), Protomartyr of America, was a hieromartyr and member of the first group of Orthodox missionaries who came from the monastery of Valaam to evangelize the native inhabitants of Alaska
 Fyodor Reshetnikov (1841–1871), Russian author
 Peter Ermakov (1884–1952), Russian Bolshevik, notable as having been among those responsible for the execution of the deposed Tsar Nicholas II, his wife, their children, and their retinue
 Pyotr Tayozhny (1887–1952), Russian sculptor
 Julian Shchutsky (1897–1938), Russian sinologist

20th century

1901–1930 
 Grigori Aleksandrov (1903–1983), Soviet film director
 Tatyana Grosman (1904–1982), Russian American printmaker and publisher
 Igor Oberberg (1907–1996), Russian-born German cinematographer
 Tatiana Tolmacheva (1907–1998), Soviet figure skater, figure skating coach and one of the founders of Soviet figure skating school
 Lev Weinstein (1916–2004), Soviet world champion and Olympic bronze medalist in shooting
 Nikolay Krasovsky (1924–2012), Russian mathematician
 Lyudmila Lyadova (born 1925), Russian composer
 Ernst Neizvestny (born 1925), Russian-American sculptor, painter, graphic artist and art philosopher
 Rimma Zhukova (1925–1999), Soviet speed skater
 Aleksandr Matveyev (1926–2010), Russian linguist
 Aleksandr Zasukhin (born 1928), Soviet boxer
 Galina Brezhneva (1929–1998), daughter of Soviet politician and longtime General Secretary Leonid Brezhnev
 Nina Ponomaryova (1929–2016), Russian discus thrower and the first Soviet Olympic champion
 Yuri Semenov (born 1929), Soviet and Russian historian, philosopher, anthropologist

1931–1940 
 Alexander Avdonin (born 1932), Russian mineralogist, archeologist
 Roman Tkachuk (1932–1994), Soviet theatre and film actor
 Erik Bulatov (born 1933), Russian artist
 Valeri Urin (born 1934), Soviet football player
 Edouard Pliner (born 1936), Soviet and Russian figure skating coach
 Aleksandr Demyanenko (1937–1999), Russian film and theater actor
 Albert Filozov (1937–2016), Soviet and Russian actor
 Aleksei Zasukhin (1937–1996), Soviet boxer
 Old Man Bukashkin (1938–2005), Russian artist and poet
 Oleg Dementiev (1938–1991), Russian chess master who won the Russian Chess Championship in 1971
 Viktor Dolnik (1938–2013), Russian ornithologist
 Alexander Dolsky (born 1938), Soviet and Russian poet, writer, artist and most famously known for being a bard
 Igor Bakalov (1939–1992), Soviet sports shooter
 Igor Ksenofontov (1939–1999), Soviet and Russian figure skating coach, founder of the Yekaterinburg figure skating school, president of the Sverdlovsk Figure Skating Federation
 Dmitri Z. Garbuzov (1940–2006), Russian-American physicist; one of the pioneers and inventors of room temperature continuous-wave-operating diode lasers and high-power diode lasers
 Alexei Khvostenko (1940–2004), Russian avant-garde poet, singer-songwriter, artist and sculptor

1941–1950 
 Viktor Anichkin (1941–1975), Russian footballer
 Vladimir Mulyavin (1941–2003), Soviet and Belarusian rock musician and the founder of the folk-rock band Pesniary
 Alexander Maslyakov (born 1941), prominent Soviet and Russian television game show host
 Vladimir Grammatikov (born 1942), Russian and Soviet actor theater and film, director, screenwriter and producer
 Samuil Lurie (1942–2015), Russian writer and literary historian
 Lyudmila Bragina (born 1943), Russian middle distance runner
 Semyon Altov (born 1945), Jewish Russian and Soviet comedy writer
 Vitaly Naumkin (born 1945), Russian Professor, Corresponding Member of the Russian Academy of Sciences
 Vladimir Gostyukhin (born 1946), Soviet, Russian and Belarusian film and stage actor
 Nukhim Rashkovsky (born 1946), Russian chess Grandmaster and coach
 Sergey Cheskidov (born 1947), Soviet and Russian sports commentator, broadcaster
 Vladimir Ilyin (born 1947), Soviet and Russian actor
 Vladimir Makeranets (born 1947), Soviet and Russian director of photography, producer and film director
 Boris Belkin (born 1948), Russian violin virtuoso
 Georgy Shishkin (born 1948), Russian painter
 Alfia Nazmutdinova (born 1949), Soviet rhythmic gymnast
 Oleg Platonov (born 1950), Russian writer, historian and economist

1951–1960 
 Galina Belyayeva (born 1951), Russian-born Kazakh sport shooter
 Stanislav Yeryomin (born 1951), Soviet basketball player
 Nadezhda Kozhushanaya (1952–1997), Soviet and Russian screenwriter and writer
 Ludmila Saunina (born 1952), Russian chess player and a woman grandmaster
 Olga Barysheva (born 1954), Russian former basketball player
 Yuri Loza (born 1954), Russian singer, poet, and composer
 Boris Golovin (born 1955), Russian singer-songwriter, musician, poet and novelist
 Viktor Shishkin (born 1955), Soviet football player and Russian football coach
 Tatiana Ferdman (born 1957), Soviet female table tennis player
 Olga Slavnikova (born 1957), Russian novelist and literary critic
 Stanislav Leonovich (born 1958), Soviet pair skater
 Mariya Litovskaya (born 1958), Soviet and Russian philologist, literary critic, Professor of the Ural Federal University
 Alexander Malinin (born 1958), Russian singer
 Nikolai Narimanov (born 1958), Soviet ice hockey player
 Aleksei Balabanov (1959–2013), Russian film director, screenwriter and producer
 Malik Gaisin (born 1959), Russian entrepreneur and politician
 Natalia Karamysheva (born 1959), Soviet ice dancer
 Oleg Khafizov (born 1959), Russian writer
 Ilya Kormiltsev (1959–2007), Russian poet, translator and publisher
 Alexander Misharin (born 1959), Russian politician and former governor of Sverdlovsk Oblast
 Andrey Prokofyev (1959–1989), Soviet athlete, winner of a gold medal in the 4 × 100 m relay at the 1980 Summer Olympics
 Yelena Volkova (born 1960), Soviet competitive volleyball player and Olympic gold medalist (1988)
 Tatyana Yumasheva (born 1960), younger daughter of former Russian President Boris Yeltsin

1961–1965 
 Marat Akbarov (born 1961), Soviet competitive pair skater
 Svitlana Mankova (born 1962), Soviet and Ukrainian handball player
 Yuri Naumov (born 1962), Russian poet, composer, singer and acoustic guitar player
 Yevgeny Roizman (born 1962), Russian politician, the Mayor of Yekaterinburg since 2013
 Ilya Byakin (born 1963), Soviet ice hockey player
 Larisa Rudakova (born 1963), Russian soprano singer
 Marat Galimov (born 1964), Russian professional football referee and a former player
 Marina Pestova (born 1964), Soviet competitive pair skater
 Aleksandr Podshivalov (born 1964), Russian association football coach and a former player
 Nikolai Stain (born 1964), Russian professional football coach and a former player
 Anton Bakov (born 1965), Russian politician and monarchist
 Svetlana Paramygina (born 1965), Soviet and Belarusian biathlete

1966–1970 
 Alyona Azernaya (born 1966), Russian naïve painter
 Elena Berezovich (born 1966), Russian linguist
 Irina Khabarova (born 1966), Russian sprinter
 Marina Klimova (born 1966), Soviet ice dancer
 Veronica Pershina (born 1966), Soviet competitive pair skater
 Anna Biryukova (born 1967), Russian female triple jumper
 Galina Belyayeva (born 1967), Russian sport shooter
 Alexei Gorshkov (born 1967), Russian ice dancing coach
 Ilya Itin (born 1967), Russian concert pianist
 Mikhail Shchennikov (born 1967), Russian race walker
 Yuliya Vlasova (born 1967), Russian short track speed skater
 Aleksei Yushkov (1967–1996), Russian professional footballer
 Tatyana Chebykina (born 1968), Russian athlete
 Irina Ilchenko (born 1968), Russian volleyball player
 Dmitry Kamenshchik (born 1968), Russian businessman
 Lyudmila Konovalova (born 1968), Russian basketball player
 Svetlana Korytova (born 1968), Russian volleyball player
 Vladimir Malakhov (born 1968), Russian professional ice hockey player
 Vladimir Presnyakov Jr. (born 1968), Soviet and Russian singer, musician, keyboardist, composer, arranger and actor
 Vitaly Vladimirov (born 1968), Soviet and Russian trombonist, composer, arranger, conductor
 Eduard Yugrin (born 1968), Russian professional footballer
 Julia Demina (born 1969), Russian chess player
 Lev Fridman (born 1969), Russian auto racing driver
 Pavlo Khnykin (born 1969), Soviet and Ukrainian freestyle swimmer
 Viktor Maigourov (born 1969), Russian biathlete
 Oleg Presnyakov (born 1969), Russian writer, playwright, screenwriter, director
 Alexey Bakunin (born 1970), Russian professional footballer
 Oleg Bogayev (born 1970), Russian playwright
 Dmitry Geller (born 1970), Russian animator and film director
 Lena Herzog (born 1970), Russian American documentary and fine art photographer

1971–1975 
 Lioudmila Kortchaguina (born 1971), Canadian marathon runner of Russian descent
 Alexander Popov (born 1971), Russian Olympic gold-winning swimmer
 Natasha Stefanenko (born 1971), Russian actress, model and television presenter
 Yelena Tyurina (born 1971), Russian female volleyball player
 Sergei Bulatov (born 1972), Russian professional football coach and a former player
 Yevgeni Davletshin (born 1972), Russian football player
 Igor Shulepov (born 1972), Russian volleyball player
 Vadim Tokarev (born 1972), American-based Russian cruiserweight boxer
 Vyacheslav Bakharev (born 1973), Russian football player
 Valeri Goryushev (1973–2014), Russian volleyball player
 Tatyana Gracheva (born 1973), Russian volleyball player
 Nikolai Khabibulin (born 1973), Russian professional ice hockey goaltender
 Natalya Morozova (born 1973), Russian volleyball player
 Ilya Ratnichkin (born 1973), Russian professional footballer
 Dmitry Sinitsyn (born 1973), Russian nordic combined
 Andrey Smirnov (born 1973), Russian wheelchair curler
 Yana Troyanova (born 1973), Russian theater and film actress
 Alexander Vyukhin (1973–2011), Ukrainian professional ice hockey goaltender of Russian ethnicity
 Alexei Yashin (born 1973), Russian professional ice hockey centerman
 Alexei Aidarov (born 1974), Russian-born former Belarusian (until 2006) and Ukrainian (since 2007) biathlete
 Oleg Dozmorov (born 1974), Russian writer and poet
 Marina Khalturina (born 1974), Russian-born Kazakhstani figure skater
 Svetlana Leshukova (born 1974), Russian swimmer
 Vladislav Otmakhov (born 1974), Russian professional ice hockey defenceman
 Vladimir Presnyakov (born 1974), Russian writer, screenwriter, director, theatre producer
 Boris Ryzhy (1974–2001), Russian poet
 Yevgeniya Artamonova (born 1975), Russian female volleyball player
 Aleksandr Gerasimov (born 1975), Russian volleyball player
 Natalia Paderina (born 1975), Russian sport shooter

1976–1980 
 Olga Kotlyarova (born 1976), Russian runner
 Igor Lukanin (born 1976), Russian competitive ice dancer who competed internationally for Azerbaijan with Kristin Fraser
 Dmitri Naumkin (born 1976), Russian competitive ice dancer
 Svetlana Nesterova (born 1976), Russian composer and violinist
 Andrei Shabanov (born 1976), Russian football and futsal player
 Roman Skorniakov (born 1976), Russian-born figure skater who mainly represented Uzbekistan
 Yelena Godina (born 1977), Russian volleyball player
 Galina Likhachova (born 1977), Russian speed skater
 Igor Malinovsky (born 1977), Russian concert violinist and Professor of Violin
 Denis Sokolov (born 1977), Russian professional ice hockey defenceman
 Alina Bronsky (born 1978), Russian-born German writer
 Alexei Bulatov (born 1978), Russian professional ice hockey forward
 Yulia Chicherina (born 1978), Russian pop-rock artist
 Pavel Datsyuk (born 1978), Russian professional ice hockey player and alternate captain for the Detroit Red Wings of the National Hockey League (NHL)
 Andrey Deyev (born 1978), Russian fencer
 Sergey Kofanov (born 1978), Russian mountaineer
 Kirill Ladygin (born 1978), Russian auto racing driver
 Valeri Pokrovsky (born 1978), Russian professional ice hockey defenceman
 Olga Sharutenko (born 1978), Russian ice dancer
 Yelena Vasilevskaya (born 1978), Russian volleyball player
 Stanislav Morozov (born 1979), former pair skater
 Alexander Motylev (born 1979), Russian chess grandmaster
 Yevgeny Salakhov (born 1979), Russian sprint canoer
 Alexei Simakov (born 1979), Russian professional ice hockey forward
 Sergei Stupin (born 1979), Russian professional ice hockey defenceman
 Yuta (born 1979), Russian singer, composer, songwriter and actress
 Vyacheslav Chistyakov (born 1980), Russian professional ice hockey forward
 Yevgeni Fyodorov (born 1980), Russian professional ice hockey centre
 Denis Kochetkov (born 1980), Russian professional ice hockey forward
 Andrei Mukhachyov (born 1980), Russian professional ice hockey defenceman
 Konstantin Syomin (born 1980), Russian journalist and TV news presenter
 Aleksei Volkov (born 1980), Russian professional hockey goaltender

1981–1985 
 Tatyana Dektyareva (born 1981), Russian track and field athlete
 Irina Denezhkina (born 1981), Russian controversial writer
 Damir Khamadiyev (born 1981), Russian futsal player
 Igor Magogin (born 1981), Russian professional ice hockey centre
 Andrei Shefer (born 1981), Russian professional ice hockey defenceman
 Yekaterina Smolentseva (born 1981), Russian female ice hockey player
 Ivan Alypov (born 1982), Russian cross-country skier
 Daniil Barantsev (born 1982), Russian-American competitive ice dancer
 Maxim Bolotin (born 1982), Russian competitive ice dancer
 Vasili Brovin (born 1982), Russian professional footballer
 Nikolay Pankratov (born 1982), Russian cross-country skier
 Alexander Tatarinov (born 1982), Russian professional ice hockey winger
 Artyom Fidler (born 1983), Russian professional footballer
 Mariya Netesova (born 1983), Russian rhythmic gymnast and Olympic champion (2000)
 Nautilus Pompilius (1983–1997), Soviet and Russian rock band
 Nataliya Shalagina (born 1983), Russian swimmer
 Olga Stulneva (born 1983), Russian athlete and bobsledder
 Svetlana Terentieva (born 1983), Russian ice hockey forward
 Irina Zilber (born 1983), Russian rhythmic gymnast and Olympic champion (2000)
 Chaif (formed 1984), Russian rock band
 Elena Murzina (born 1984), Russian rhythmic gymnast and Olympic champion (2004)
 Yury Prilukov (born 1984), Russian freestyle swimmer
 Agatha Christie (founded 1985), Soviet and Russian rock band
 Alexander Kudryavtsev (born 1985), Russian professional tennis player
 Georgi Misharin (born 1985), Russian professional ice hockey defenseman
 Sergei Nemolodyshev (born 1985), Russian professional ice hockey winger
 Alexei Puninski (born 1985), Russian-born Croatian swimmer
 Diana Rennik (born 1985), Russian-born Estonian pair skater
 Marina Sheshenina (born 1985), Russian female volleyball player

1986–1990 
 Konstantin Agapov (born 1986), Russian futsal player
 Pavel Korpachev (born 1986), Russian freestyle skier
 Ivan Kovalev (born 1986), Russian professional racing cyclist
 Elena Melnik (born 1986), Russian fashion model
 Stepan Poistogov (born 1986), Russian middle-distance runner
 Vera Sessina (born 1986), Russian individual rhythmic gymnast
 Elena Turysheva (born 1986), Russian cross country skier
 Denis Galimzyanov (born 1987), Russian racing cyclist
 Anastasia Gorshkova (born 1987), Russian competitive ice dancer
 Alena Kaufman (born 1987), Russian paralympic biathlete and skier
 Igor Lysyj (born 1987), Russian chess grandmaster
 Aleksandra Pasynkova (born 1987), Russian female volleyball player
 Dmitri Rusanov (born 1987), Russian former professional footballer
 Maria Smolnikova (born 1987), Russian actress
 Kirill Starkov (born 1987), Danish ice hockey player of Russian ethnicity
 Kseniya Aksyonova (born 1988), Russian track and field sprinter
 Aliya Garayeva (born 1988), retired gymnast, she represented Russia (until 2005) and Azerbaijan (2006–2012)
 Evgeny Kurbatov (born 1988), Russian professional ice hockey defenceman
 Nikita Lobintsev (born 1988), Russian freestyle swimmer
 Yegor Nikolayev (born 1988), Russian runner
 Yuliya Pidluzhnaya (born 1988), Russian long jumper
 Anastasia Poltoratskaya (born 1988), Russian tennis player
 Yury Postrigay (born 1988), Russian canoeist
 Viktorija Rusakova (born 1988), Russian female former volleyball player
 Alexander Yukseyev (born 1988), Russian ice hockey defenceman
 Smyslovye Gallyutsinatsii (formed 1989), Russian rock band
 Yekaterina Lebedeva (born 1989), Russian ice hockey forward
 Ivan Sozonov (born 1989), Russian badminton player
 Angelika Timanina (born 1989), Russian competitor in synchronized swimming
 Dimitri Tsyganov (born 1989), Russian professional ice hockey player
 Alexandr Zaboev (born 1989), Russian pair skater
 Alexander Antropov (born 1990), Russian former professional ice hockey player
 Sergei Chistyakov (born 1990), Russian ice hockey player
 Ivan Chudin (born 1990), Russian professional football player
 Anna Gavrilenko (born 1990), Russian group rhythmic gymnast and Olympic champion
 Ekaterina Kosianenko (born 1990), Russian volleyball player
 Fedor Malykhin (born 1990), Russian professional ice hockey forward
 Alyona Mamina (born 1990), Russian track and field sprinter
 Vladimir Mineev (born 1990), Russian heavyweight kickboxer and mixed martial artist
 Anatoli Nikontsev (born 1990), Russian professional ice hockey winger

1991–2000 
 Yekaterina Ananina (born 1991), Russian ice hockey forward
 Andrei Ankudinov (born 1991), Russian ice hockey player
 Irina Antonenko (born 1991), Russian actress, model and beauty pageant titleholder
 Valeria Savinykh (born 1991), Russian tennis player
 Filipp Savchenko (born 1991), Russian ice hockey player
 David Belyavskiy (born 1992), Russian artistic gymnast
 Stefan Stepanov (born 1992), Russian professional ice hockey defenceman
 Mikhail Ustyantsev (born 1992), Russian ice hockey player
 Alexander Zakirov (born 1992), Russian ice hockey player
 Vera Bazarova (born 1993), Russian pair skater
 Kseniia Ilchenko (born 1994), Russian female volleyball player
 Oleksiy Khoblenko (born 1994), Ukrainian football striker
 Maxim Miroshkin (born 1994), Russian pair skater
 Nikita Tryamkin (born 1994), Russian ice hockey defenceman
 Elbeyi Guliyev (born 1995), Azerbaijani professional football player
 Maxim Kovtun (born 1995), Russian figure skater
 Aleksandr Sobolev (born 1995), Russian professional football player
 Anastasiia Tatareva, (born 1997), Russian group rhythmic gymnast
 Yulia Lipnitskaya (born 1998), Russian figure skater
 Daria Ustinova (born 1998), Russian backstroke swimmer

Lived in Yekaterinburg 
 Onésime Clerc (1845-1920), Russian naturalist of Swiss origin
 Pavel Bazhov (1879–1950), Russian writer; between 1889 and 1893 he studied in a religious school in Yekaterinburg
 Dmitry Kharitonov (1896–1970), the first native Russian arachnologist
 Sergei Vonsovsky (1910–1998), Soviet and Russian physicist; Honorary citizen of Yekaterinburg. One of the streets of Yekaterinburg is called after academician Vonsovsky.
 Chiang Fang-liang (1916–2004), wife of President Chiang Ching-kuo and served as First Lady of the Republic of China on Taiwan from 1978 to 1988; moved to Yekaterinburg during World War I
 Gennady Mesyats (born 1936), Russian physicist, founder of several scientific schools; Honorary citizen of Yekaterinburg
 Eduard Rossel (born 1937), Russian politician of German origin, governor (1995–2009) of Sverdlovsk Oblast; Honorary citizen of Yekaterinburg
 Nikolay Karpol (born 1938), national women volleyball team coach (VC Uralochka-NTMK Yekaterinburg); Honorary Citizen of the Sverdlovsk Oblast
 Vladislav Krapivin (born 1938), Russian children's books writer; Honorary citizen of Yekaterinburg
 Arkady Chernetsky (born 1950), Russian politician; Mayor of Yekaterinburg (1992–2010)
 Evgeny Fateev (born 1958), Russian physicist and astrophysicist
 Vassily Sigarev (born 1977), Russian playwright, screenwriter and film director; graduated from the Yekaterinburg Theatre Institute
 Louis J. Marinelli (born 1986), American activist, self-subscribed Californian nationalist activist, migrated from the United States due of Anti-Russian hysteria affected him.
 Sofia Nikitchuk (born 1993), Russian actress, model and beauty pageant titleholder who was crowned Miss Russia 2015

See also 

 List of Russian people
 List of Russian-language poets

References 

Yekaterinburg
Yekaterinburg
List